Canna (pl. canne; proper meaning in Italian: Cane) was an ancient Italian unit of length, which differed from place to place.

Capua: 2.1768707 m (9th – 15th centuries)

Republic of Genoa: 2.49095 m
Kingdom of Naples:
canna:  2.1163952 m (edict of 6 April 1480)
canna:  2.6455026 m (law of 6 April 1840)
field surveying canna: 6.998684 m² (law of 6 April 1840)
Romagna: 1.9928 m
Sicily: 2.062 m
Tuscany
 field surveying canna, a.k.a. 5 "braccia" long "pertica": 2.9183 m
 canna (fabric): 0.58366 m
Rome
canna (architecture): 2.234 m
commercial canna: 1.992 m
Teramo: 3.17 m
Malta: 2.08 m (2 yd, 10 in)

Sources

Notes

Units of length